Pseudoxytenanthera monadelpha is a species of bamboo in the grass family. It is native to India, Sri Lanka, Laos, Myanmar, Vietnam.

References
The Plant List
Kew.org
Researchgate

Endemic flora of Sri Lanka
Bambusoideae